The 1891–92 season is the 18th season of competitive football by Rangers.

Overview
Rangers played a total of 28 competitive matches during the 1891–92 season. The club began the season as champions but ended it in fifth position, winning exactly half of their 22 league matches.

The club were knocked out the Scottish Cup at the semi-final stage after losing to Celtic by 3–5.

Results
All results are written with Rangers' score first.

Scottish League

Scottish Cup

Appearances

See also
 1891–92 in Scottish football
 1891–92 Scottish Cup

Rangers F.C. seasons
Rangers